Bernard Haussoullier (12 September 1852, Paris – 25 July 1926, Saint-Prix) was a French Hellenist, epigrapher and archaeologist.

Biography 
A student of the École normale supérieure and member of the French School at Athens (1876-1880), Bernard Haussoullier carried out a mission in Crete in 1878–1879 where he identified two new fragments of the Gortyn code.

A lecturer at the Faculty of Arts of Caen (1880-1883), a substitute teacher at the University of Bordeaux, he became a lecturer at the École pratique des hautes études for Greek antiquities in 1885. Director the Revue de philologie, de littérature et d'histoire anciennes, he directed the excavations of the temple of Apollo in Didyma with Emmanuel Pontremoli from 1891 to 1896.

A friend of Jean-Vincent Scheil, he edited the Bronze osselet offered as a votive gift to Apollo didymien by two people of Miletus, osselet which was caught up as a war prize by Darius and found at Susa.

He was elected a member of the Académie des Inscriptions et Belles-Lettres in 1905.

Works 
1879: Inscriptions de Chios, in Bulletin de correspondance hellénique
1884: Quomodo sepulcra Tanagraei decoraverint
1886: Le Dème d'Éleusis
1888–1891 and 1896–1903 La Vie municipale en Attique. Essai sur l’organisation des dèmes au IVe siècle, 2 vols
1891–1904 Recueil des inscriptions juridiques grecques, with Georges Mathieu, 2 vols
1896: Grèce, Collection des guides Joanne
1904: Didymes. Fouilles de 1895 à 1896, with E. Pontremoli
1905: Études sur l'histoire de Milet et du Didyméion
1909 Rapport sur les travaux des Écoles d'Athènes et de Rome en 1908
1917: Traité entre Delphes et Pellana

Bibliography 
 J-B. Chabot, Éloge funèbre de M. Bernard Haussoulier, Comptes rendus de l'Académie des inscriptions et belles-lettres, 1926
 E. Chatelain, Bernar Haussoullier, Revue de philologie N° 50, 1926
 Eve Gran-Aymerich, Les chercheurs de passé, Éditions du CNRS, 2007, p. 860

External links 
 Bernard Haussoullier (1852-1926) on data.bnf.fr
 Éloge funèbre de M. Bernard Haussoullier on Persée
 BERNARD HAUSSOULLIER (1853-1926) on jstor 

Archaeologists from Paris
French hellenists
French epigraphers
École Normale Supérieure alumni
Members of the Académie des Inscriptions et Belles-Lettres
Members of the French School at Athens
1852 births
1926 deaths